Rashidabad Halt railway station is a railway station in Sindh, Pakistan, on the Hyderabad-Khokhrapar Branch Line.

See also
 List of railway stations in Pakistan
 Pakistan Railways

References

External links

Railway stations in Sindh
Railway stations on Hyderabad–Khokhrapar Branch Line